Miloš S. Milojević (1840–1897) was a Serbian lawyer, writer and politician. His work has been described as "at a ridge between history and literature", mostly for his travel-recording genre.

Biography
Miloš S. Milojević, son of a parish priest, was born at Crna Bara in Mačva, Serbia, on 16 October 1840. He graduated with a law degree from Belgrade's Velika škola in 1862; studied philosophy, philology and history at the University of Moscow, from 1862 to 1865. His professor was Osip Bodyansky. He didn't wait to graduate and in 1866 Milojević returned to Serbia to work for the government judicial system, and later taught at high schools in Valjevo, Belgrade and Leskovac.

He died in Belgrade on 24 June 1897. He was buried in Novo Groblje.

Historiography

In 1887 his approach to historiography was challenged and debated by Ilarion Ruvarac and Ljubomir Kovačević and eventually proved erroneous through critical methods, though his opus is not completely abandoned. He travelled to the Kosovo and Metohija region from 1871 to 1877 and left three volumes of data and maps which testify that Serbs were the majority and Albanians the minority population. His demographic-statistical structure matched an independent census taken by the Austrian authorities at about the same time.

Works
 Odlomci istorije Srba i srpskih - jugoslavenskih - zemalja u Turskoj i Austriji, Beograd, 1872.
 Pesme i običaji ukupnog naroda srpskog
 Putopisi dela prave - Stare Srbije
 Naši manastiri i kaluđerstvo
 Prva dečanska hrisovulja
 Druga dečanska hrisovulja

Translations from Russian
 Običaji velikorusa
 Maljuta Skuratov (in two volumes)

Manuscripts
 Putopise (in nine segments)
 Četvrta knjiga pesama i običaja
 Nemanjića
 Prizrenska tapija
 Pravila svete Petke paraskeve srpske
 Pravila svetom Simenu srpskom
 Opšti list iz Patrijaršije Pećske
 Odgovor na izmišljotine u 10 i 12 broju Budućnosti, pod imenom: Naša agitacija na istok

See also
 Jovan Hadži-Vasiljević
 Vladan Đorđević
 Ami Boué
 Alexander Hilferding

References

1840 births
1897 deaths
People from Bogatić
19th-century Serbian people
People from the Principality of Serbia
People from the Kingdom of Serbia
Serbian nationalists
Imperial Moscow University alumni
Burials at Belgrade New Cemetery